Intentional Logic: A Logic Based on Philosophical Realism is a book by Henry Babcock Veatch published in 1952.

American non-fiction books
Philosophy books
Logic literature
1952 non-fiction books
Philosophical logic